Tan Ai-chen is a Taiwanese actress.

Filmography

Television series

References

External links
 
 

1953 births
Taiwanese television actresses
Living people